Olvi Cola (formerly Classic Cola) is a cola soft drink manufactured by Olvi in Finland. There is also a light version and a vanilla variant Vanilja-Kola.

External links
Classic Cola on Olvi's site

Cola brands